= Rockhampton National School =

School in Queensland, Australia

Coordinates: 23°22′55.35″S 150°30′41.21″E

The Rockhampton National School was a school in Rockhampton, Queensland.

On February 15, 1859, there was a meeting of those appointed as the Rockhampton School and Church committee, over which the Sub-Collector of Customs, Henry Lumsden, presided, when it was resolved to erect a school building, 40 ft (12.3m) long and 20 ft (6.15m) wide in which Divine service could also be held on Sundays.

The building having been completed, it was opened for business on August 16, 1859, F K Milne, afterwards the first town clerk, being appointed schoolmaster, each scholar to pay 1/6 (1 shilling and 6 pence) (or 18 pence) per week. Thus a day school was started, the population being only a few hundreds, principally men.

By May 1860, it was found that the school building was not large enough, and it was resolved to petition the new Queensland Government for a site for a public school. This request was granted and the allotments at the corner of William and Denison Streets was granted-where the Rockhampton Special School now stands.
